Ornipholidotos sylphida is a butterfly in the family Lycaenidae. It is found in Cameroon, Gabon and Angola. The habitat consists of forests.

References

Butterflies described in 1892
Ornipholidotos
Butterflies of Africa